Kaizhou District, formerly known as Kai County, Kaixian or Kaihsien is a district under the jurisdiction of Chongqing Municipality, in southwestern China, bordering Sichuan province to the west. It has an area of 3,959 square km. As of the end of 2009, it had a population of 1.62 million. It is located 330 kilometers from the urban centre of Chongqing proper.

History

The county has a history dating back some 1800 years.

In 1373, during the Ming Dynasty, it adopted the name Kaizhou.

In the summer of 1907, there were disturbances in Kai County. Around that time, government schools, Roman Catholic premises and China Inland Mission property as well as the homes of many Chinese Christians in Kai County were successively looted and destroyed.

Li Ching-Yuen, known for his supposed extreme longevity, died in Kai County in 1933.

Unusual rain patterns and flooding in the Summer of 1982 led to land subsidence. It was reported in the September 6, 1982 edition of the Sichuan Daily that, "In the fourth Tuoxiang brigade, Hujia commune, Yuexi District, Kai County, more than 300 mu of land subsided; and 310 houses owned by a commune unit, a supply and marketing cooperative, 10 units and 16 commune households all subsided."

Until 2004 the county was one of the poorest in the municipality, home to some 10% of Chongqing municipality residents that lived in poverty. The government has attempted to remedy this in recent years.

In the March 27, 2015 edition of Beijing Today, Kai County was noted as "the nation's largest exporter of migrant labor. There were 535,000 from that county in 2014, and 15 percent were older than 50. In Fengcun Village, half the villagers are migrant workers."

Administrative divisions
As of 2018, Kaizhou District administered seven subdistricts, twenty-six towns and seven townships.

Climate

References

External links
Official website of Kaizhou Government

Districts of Chongqing